Sattar Khalaf (born 1 July 1946) is a former Iraqi football goalkeeper who played for Iraq in the 1972 AFC Asian Cup.

He played for the national team between 1968 and 1975.

Career statistics

International goals
Scores and results list Iraq's goal tally first.

References

Iraqi footballers
Iraq international footballers
Al-Shorta SC players
Living people
1972 AFC Asian Cup players
Association football goalkeepers
1946 births